Garner is an unincorporated community in Boyd County, Kentucky, United States.

References

Unincorporated communities in Boyd County, Kentucky
Unincorporated communities in Kentucky